PLRA may refer to:
Authentic Radical Liberal Party
Prison Litigation Reform Act